is a Japanese avant-garde anime television series produced by Toei Animation. A spin-off of 2006's horror anthology series Ayakashi: Samurai Horror Tales, Mononoke  follows the character of the medicine seller as he continues to face a myriad of  supernatural perils. Mononoke takes place between the end of the Edo period  and Meiji Era of Japan with the four class system, Samurai being the highest class and merchants (such as the medicine seller himself) being in the lowest class. Only Samurai were permitted to carry swords, which is why it comes as a shock to many of the characters that the medicine seller would be carrying a sword.

Plot
Mononoke follows a wandering, nameless character known only as the "Medicine Seller" (voiced by Takahiro Sakurai). The series is made up of individual chapters in which the medicine seller encounters, combats and subsequently destroys mononoke. The mononoke are a type of ayakashi, unnatural spirits that linger in the human world by binding themselves to negative human emotions. The Medicine Seller always proceeds in the same manner, using his knowledge of the supernatural to fend off the mononoke until he can learn the spirit's shape (Katachi), truth (Makoto) and reasoning (Kotowari). Only then can he unsheathe his sword and exorcise the demon. The English subtitles translate these three necessities as Form, Truth, and Reason.

Episodes 1–2: Zashiki-warashi

Plot
While spending the night in a traditional inn, the Medicine Seller stumbles upon a strange phenomenon. A pregnant woman named Shino who is desperately seeking shelter at the inn is led to the last vacant room. The room, though, is haunted by a group of Zashiki Warashi. When the Zashiki Warashi kill an assassin aiming for Shino's life, protecting Shino and her unborn child, the Medicine Seller inquires into the origin of the mononoke.

The innkeeper reveals that the inn used to be a brothel, which she owned and ran. The innkeeper forced her prostitutes to abort their children to continue working, and Shino's room is the room in which the abortions took place. The Medicine Seller realizes that the mononoke are attracted to Shino because of their strong desire to be birthed. The Zashiki Warashi want Shino to give birth to them, and she agrees, much to the Medicine Seller's dismay. She pulls the talisman warding off the mononoke from her stomach. As it turns out one of the Zashiki Warashi that she had met upon her arrival was in fact her own child. However, the overload of all the spirits causes Shino's in-the-womb child to start bleeding. At this point, realizing their wish would cause only harm to the only person that showed them kindness, the Zashiki Warashi smiles and allows the Medicine Seller to destroy them with the sword.

Characters
 Shino (志乃) (voiced by Rie Tanaka): The pregnant woman who seeks shelter at a rainy night. She became pregnant with a young lord's baby when working in a landlord's house, and wishes to give birth safely.
 Hisayo (久代) (voiced by Toshiko Fujita): The keeper of the inn which used to be a brothel she owned. The room she offered to Shino was where she forced her prostitutes to abort children.
 Tokuji (徳次) (voiced by Kōzō Shiotani): A helper in the inn. He is also the one who assisted Hisayo in forcing prostitutes to abort.
 Naosuke (直助) (voiced by Eiji Takemoto): An assassin who wants to kill Shino and her baby.
 Young Lord (voiced by Yūsuke Numata): The man who got Shino pregnant and then abandoned her.
 Zashiki Warashi (座敷童子) (voiced by Aiko Hibi): The spirit of the children killed by Hisayo many years ago.

Episodes 3–5: Umibōzu

Plot
Traveling on a merchant's luxurious ship, the Medicine Seller and the other passengers drift into the Dragon's Triangle, a mysterious sea full of ayakashi. Among the passengers are Kayo, a servant girl from the Sakai house of Bakeneko fame, Genkei, a Buddhist monk, and Genyousai, a minstrel and spiritualist. Through the appearance of Umizatou, an ayakashi who demands that the passengers reveal their worst fears, the group discovers that Genkei was the one who set the ship off course.

Genkei explains that he and his sister Oyō, who was five years his junior, grew up very close ("too close" he states) because they were left alone on their tiny island home when their parents perished at sea. This lust for his sister drove him to become a Buddhist ascetic at the age of 15, leaving Oyō behind.

Although he faithfully immersed himself in study and the solitary monk's life, he still could not extinguish his lust for his sister. When he learned that their home island's ships were sinking and being destroyed at sea, he accepts his village's request for him to return to become a human sacrifice to the sea by being imprisoned alive in a "hollow boat" set adrift. He explained that he would rather be dead than live with his unquenchable thirst to "lie with" Oyō. However, on the night before he was to climb into the boat at sunrise, he met with Oyō, who was now 16 and "so pretty." She then confessed to him that she had the same feelings for him all along and that since they could never marry she would rather become the sacrifice in his stead, preferring, as she stated, "to go to the pure land" rather than marry a man who was not her brother. Upon hearing this, the young recently promoted monk fled vowing to commit suicide to join Oyō in the afterlife. He could not do this and, instead, spent 50 years in deep meditation praying for the soul of his poor sister Oyō, her corpse supposedly adrift in the hollow boat in the Ayakashi Sea. However, deep down he actually was glad that his sister died instead of him, and that guilt followed him. It was his intense focus—metaphorically and specifically, his right eye—on that area of the sea and magnified by his guilt over not truly loving his sister that had caused the Dragon's Triangle or Ayakashi (spirits, generally malevolent) Sea to be so deadly.

Tragically, the ayakashi showed the hollow boat to the current passengers by dragging it up from the bottom of the sea onto the deck of their ship. Although they thought they heard scratching from the inside, they discovered that it had lain empty for 50 years, and that Oyō had in reality "given herself to the sea," as she too could no longer live with her own lust for her brother.  The Medicine Seller discovers that Genkei is the mononoke, or at least his darker side has become one, and that this particular mononoke (literally translated as "enraged god who is sick" that form when human feelings of vengeance, rage, guilt etc. meld with ayakashi) was responsible for the Ayakashi Sea's unrest. The Medicine Seller exterminates the mononoke at Genkei's request and restores calm to him. After 50 years of guilt and lust, he is now at peace, although his beloved Oyō died for naught.

Characters
 Kayo (加世) (voiced by Yukana): A woman who knows the medicine seller from the previous series Ayakashi: Samurai Horror Tales. She is a servant girl seeking a new job in Edo.
 Genkei (源慧) (voiced by Ryusei Nakao): A respected Buddhist monk.
 Sōgen (菖源) (voiced by Daisuke Namikawa): An apprentice monk following Genkei.
 Hyōe Sasaki (佐々木兵衛) (voiced by Daisuke Sakaguchi): A young samurai who possesses a famous sword named Kanesada.
 Genyōsai Yanagi (柳幻殃斉) (voiced by Tomokazu Seki): A minstrel practicing Shugendō who is knowledgeable about Ayakashi.
 Tamon Mikuniya (三國屋多門) (voiced by Yasuhiro Takato): The owner of the ship.
 Goromaru (五浪丸) (voiced by Eiji Takemoto): The captain of the ship.
 Umizatou (海座頭) (voiced by Norio Wakamoto): An ayakashi who demands that the passengers reveal their worst fears.
 Oyō (お庸) (voiced by Haruna Ikezawa): The younger sister of Genkei. She volunteered herself to replace Genkei as a sacrifice to the sea.

Episodes 6–7: Noppera-bō

Plot
A despairing woman named Ochou, wishing for freedom but unable to escape her oppression, confesses to killing her husband's entire family. The Medicine Seller doubts this story and visits Ochou in her prison cell to ask her for the truth, but encounters a mononoke in a Noh mask who fights the Medicine Seller and allows Ochou to escape. The man in the mask convinces Ochou that he has given her freedom by helping her kill her family, but the Medicine Seller pursues the two and reveals to Ochou that she had killed not her husband's family, but herself. Ochou married into a good family as her mother wished, but in her desire to please her mother, withstood abuse from her new family to the point of forsaking any happiness she could have gained from her life.  When Ochou realizes this, the man in the Noh mask vanishes, and Ochou finds herself in her kitchen.  It is implied that the man in the mask was an illusion conjured by the Medicine Seller to help Ochou escape—at the end of the episode, Ochou ignores her husband's orders and leaves her family, gaining the freedom she had long desired.

Characters
 Ochō (お蝶) (voiced by Houko Kuwashima): A woman who married into a good family. In order to please her mother, she withstands abuse from her husband's family.
 Man in Fox Mask (仮面の男) (voiced by Hikaru Midorikawa): An Ayakashi wearing a fox mask. He can change his fox mask to other masks.
 Ochō's mother (お蝶の実母) (voiced by Ako Mayama): She wishes for Ochō to marry into a good samurai family because she lost her husband.
 Ochō's husband (お蝶の亭主) (voiced by Eiji Takemoto): He treats Ochō badly; as if she is a servant.
 Ochō's husband's mother (姑) (voiced by Oriko Uemura): She doesn't like Ochō.
 Ochō's brother-in-law (義理の弟) (voiced by Hiroshi Okamoto): The younger brother of Ochō's husband. He treats Ochō badly.
 Wife of Ochō's brother-in-law (義理の弟の嫁) (voiced by Aki Sasaki): She treats Ochō badly as well.
 Magistrate (奉行) (voiced by Fukuhara Kouhei): He judges Ochō's case.

Episodes 8–9: Nue

Plot
Three men seeking to marry Lady Ruri, the sole heir to the Fuenokouji school of incense (kōdō), arrive at her mansion to participate in a competition of incense only to find that the fourth suitor is missing and that the Medicine Seller has taken his place.  During the competition, Lady Ruri is murdered. When the Medicine Seller inquires as to why the three suitors are so desperate to inherit the school even after Lady Ruri's death, the suitors reveal that the competition is not actually over the school of incense, but the Toudaiji, a piece of wood rumored to grant its owner great power.

Although Medicine Seller presides over a second incense contest, none of the three suitors win the Toudaiji, as all are killed.  It is revealed that the suitors had already been killed by the Toudaiji, and that the Medicine Seller put on this act to make them realize their deaths. The Medicine Seller then asks the Toudaiji, the true mononoke, to reveal itself. The Toudaiji draws its sense of self-esteem from the fact that people value it so highly, yet in truth, it is nothing but a rotting piece of wood.  The Toudaiji kills those who seek it, including Lady Ruri's suitors, perpetuating the bloodshed for its sake. The Medicine Seller destroys the Toudaiji, appeasing the souls of its victims, including Lady Ruri's suitors.

This chapter makes a reference to the Rannatai (the type of wood described above) that once existed in the Shōsōin (Great Treasure Room) of the Tōdai-ji temple in Nara, Japan.

Characters
Ōsawa Rōbo (澤廬房) (voiced by Takeshi Aono): One of Lady Ruri's suitors. A courtier.
 Muromachi Tomoyoshi (室町具慶) (voiced by Eiji Takemoto): One of Lady Ruri's suitors. A samurai.
 Nakarai Tansui (半井淡澄) (voiced by Masashi Hirose): One of Lady Ruri's suitors. A fishmonger.
 Jissonji Konari (実尊寺惟勢) (voiced by Naoya Uchida): One of Lady Ruri's suitors, horribly murdered prior to the competition.
 Lady Ruri (瑠璃姫, Ruri-hime) (voiced by Wakana Yamazaki): The incense school founder who owns the Tōdaiji. She was murdered during the competition.
 Old woman (老いた尼僧) (voiced by Yuri Kobayashi): A servant of Lady Ruri.
 Girl (童女) (voiced by Kamada Kozue): A mysterious girl who appears and disappears whenever Muromachi is alone.
 Nue (鵺): A murderous, shape-shifting mononoke born from the spirit of the Tōdaiji.

Episodes 10–12: Bakeneko

Plot
Set in a time decidedly later than the previous arcs — implied to be in the 1920s — the Medicine Seller boards a train with several other passengers. Unfortunately, the train hits a ghostly girl on the tracks, and six passengers and the Medicine Seller are locked in the first car. The Medicine Seller questions the passengers to reveal a dark connection between them, shedding light on the murder of a young newspaper reporter. At the end of the episode the woman's spirit has its revenge, the passengers are saved, and the Medicine Seller challenges the audience to reveal to him their Truth and Reason, vowing to continue hunting mononoke as long as they roam the world.

Many voice actors from the original Bakeneko arc reprise their roles in this Bakeneko arc, which shares a similar plot to the original Bakeneko arc, possibly implying that the characters from the original have reincarnated into this arc.

Characters
 Kiyoshi Moriya (森谷清) (voiced by Eiji Takemoto): A journalist who colludes with the mayor. Because they didn't want to reveal the secret of the subway, he murdered Setsuko, who knew the truth.
 Setsuko Ichikawa (市川節子) (voiced by Fumiko Orikasa): A journalist. A subordinate of Kiyoshi Moriya. She found out the secret of the subway and attempted to report it, but she was then killed by Moriya. She reappeared as a ghost and finally killed Moriya.
 Jyutarō Fukuda (福田寿太郎) (voiced by Hiroshi Iwasaki): The mayor.
 Sakae Kadowaki (門脇栄) (voiced by Minoru Inaba): A police officer whose task is to protect the mayor.
 Bunpei Kinoshita (木下文平) (voiced by Seiji Sasaki): The driver of the train. Because he was tired while driving, he wasn't able to stop the train when he found Setsuko dropped on the railway.
 Nomoto Chiyo (野本チヨ) (voiced by Yukana): A waitress in a cafe who wishes to become a celebrity. In order to be known, she provided false testimony to the police about Setsuko's death.
 Haru Yamaguchi (山口ハル) (voiced by Yōko Sōmi): A widow. She heard the scream when meeting her lover, but she ignored it.
 Masao Kobayashi (小林正男) (voiced by Aiko Hibi): A milk delivery boy who witnessed the death of Setsuko, but escaped without calling the police.

Media

Anime
Produced by Toei Animation, the anime series was directed by Kenji Nakamura, written by Chiaki J. Konaka, Ikuko Takahashi, Michiko Yokote and Manabu Ishikawa. Takashi Hashimoto directed the animation and was the character designer, Takashi Kurahashi was the art director, its music was composed by Yasuharu Takanashi, and it was broadcast in Fuji Television's block Noitamina between July 2007 and September 2007, lasting 12 episodes. Siren Visual licensed it for Australasian region.

Episode list

Film
At a 15th anniversary event held on June 18, 2022, an anime film by Twin Engine was announced. Kenji Nakamura will return to direct the film. Originally it was scheduled to premiere in 2023, however, in February 2023, it was announced that the film would be delayed to beyond 2023. Additionally, Takahiro Sakurai, who originally was returning to reprise the role of the Medicine Seller, was removed from the cast of the film.

Manga
A manga adaptation of the original Bakeneko arc was published in Young Gangan between August 17, 2007 and August 1, 2008. The individual chapters were collected and released in two tankōbon (collected volumes) by Square Enix on January 25, 2008, and September 25, 2008. A second manga series started to be published on September 25, 2013 by Tokuma Shoten on its magazine Monthly Comic Zenon. The last chapter of it was serialized in Monthly Comic Zenon on November 25, 2014. The series was released into two volumes on July 19, 2014, and December 20, 2014 respectively.

 Mononoke （published by Young Gangan Comics, Square Enix）
 Illustrator - Yaeko Ninagawa. 
 Original work - Anime「Bakeneko」by Kai 〜ayakashi〜 Production Committee.
 First volume （published on Feb 25th, 2008）
 Second volume （published on Oct 25th, 2008）
 Serialized in magazine 『Young Gangan Comics』.
 Mononoke -Umibōzu- （published by Zenon Comics, North Stars Pictures, sold by Tokuma Shoten）
 Illustrator - Yaeko Ninagawa.
 Script - Chiaki J. Konaka.
 Original Work - Anime「Umibōzu」by 〜Mononoke〜Production Committee.
 First volume （published on Jul 19th, 2014）
 Second volume （published on Jan 9th, 2015）
 Serialized in magazine 『Zenon Comics』.
 Mononoke -Zashiki Warashi- （published by Zenon Comics, North Stars Pictures, sold by Tokuma Shoten）
 Illustrator - Yaeko Ninagawa.
 Original work - Anime「Zashiki Warashi」by 〜Mononoke〜 Production Committee.
（published on Dec 10th, 2015）
 Serialized in magazine 『Zenon Comics』.
 Mononoke -Nue- （published by Tokuma Shoten）
 Illustrator - Yaeko Ninagawa.
 Original work - Anime「Nue」by 〜Mononoke〜 Production Committee.
（will be published in 2016）
 Serializing in magazine 『Zenon Comics』.

Music
 Opening theme -  Last quarter moon (Kagen no Tsuki / 下弦の月)
 Lyrics - Ai Kawa (香和文) / Composer & Arranger - Ryōta Komatsu / Singers - Ryōta Komatsu & Charlie Kosei
 Ending theme - Summer flower (Natsu no Hana / ナツノハナ)
 Lyrics - Miyuki Hashimoto / Composer- Naohisa Taniguchi / Arranger - CHOKKAKU / Singer - JUJU

Stage play
At a 15th anniversary event held on June 18, 2022, a stage play based on the anime was announced.

Reception
The directing and art have been called "boldly confrontational." It blends a murder mystery structure with "twist of supernatural and a shake of historical, peppered with plenty of stylistic experimentation." It frequently achieves "the ideal - great directing combined with great animation." The Mainichi newspaper said it could not be dismissed as a mere experiment, and that the story's themes were every bit as advanced as the digital animation techniques employed.

See also
 Princess Mononoke
 Yōkai

References

External links
 Official website 
 Official Toei website 
 Anoboy
 

2007 Japanese television series endings
2007 anime television series debuts
Anime with original screenplays
Discotek Media
Gangan Comics manga
Mystery anime and manga
Noitamina
Psychological horror anime and manga
Seinen manga
Television shows about exorcism
Toei Animation television
Tokuma Shoten manga
Yōkai in anime and manga